The Battle of Parkumäki took place on July 21, 1789 during Gustav III's Russian War, Sweden defeated the Russian Empire.

History 
During the time when the Russian general Ivan Ivanovich Michelson pulled his forces back, the Swedish commander Curt von Stedingk with about 1,300 men started his offensive against the remaining Russian general Schultz and his 1,000 soldiers whom stood by Parkumäki, and another 500 by Puiko. On July 21, Stedingk flanked and overwhelmed both the Russian positions and captured their artillery. The Russians lost 200 men killed, 130 wounded and 500 captured during the fighting along with all their artillery, baggage and two standards lost to the Swedes, who suffered 186 men dead and wounded. Curt von Stedingk was promoted to major general after the victory.

References

Parkumäki
Parkumäki
1789 in Europe
Parkumäki
Parkumäki
History of South Savo